The 1924 Southern Conference football season was the college football games played by the member schools of the Southern Conference as part of the 1924 college football season. The season began on September 20. Sewanee and VMI joined the conference this year. Vanderbilt dropped its comembership with the Southern Intercollegiate Athletic Association (SIAA).

Alabama was awarded the Champ Pickens Trophy as conference champion, though the loss to Centre hindered any claims of a championship of the South.

Vanderbilt end Hek Wakefield was a second-team Walter Camp All-American.

Season overview

Results and team statistics

Key

PPG = Average of points scored per game
PAG = Average of points allowed per game

Regular season

SoCon teams in bold.

Week One

Week Two

Week Three

Week Four

Week Five

Week Six

Week Seven

Week Eight

Week Nine

Week Ten

Week Eleven

Week Twelve

Awards and honors

All-Americans

E – Henry "Hek" Wakefield, Vanderbilt (WC-2; INS; NEA; LP-1; BE-1; NB-1; DW-1; WE-3; BC)
T – Jim Taylor, Georgia (NB-3)
G – Bill Buckler, Alabama (NB-3)
G – Walt Godwin, Georgia Tech (NB-3)
C – Clyde Propst, Alabama (LP-2)
HB – Gil Reese, Vanderbilt (NB-3)
FB – Doug Wycoff, Georgia Tech (ASM-3; LP-1 [hb]; NB-2; DW-2; WE-3)

All-Southern team

The following includes the composite All-Southern team compiled by the Atlanta Journal. C2 refers to another composite.

References